B. Vijaya Reddy (15 July 1936 – 9 October 2020), better known as Vijay Reddy or Vijay, was an Indian film director who worked primarily in Kannada cinema with over 50 movies to his credit. His debut directorial venture was Rangamahal Rahasya (1970). He was known for his collaborations with leading Kannada actor Rajkumar for movies like Gandhada Gudi (1973), Mayura  (1975), Naa Ninna Mareyalare (1976) and Sanaadi Appanna (1977) which are considered among the classic movies of Kannada cinema.

Early life 
Reddy was born in Tadepalligudem in the West Godavari district of Madras Presidency in British India to a farming family. He subsequently went to Madras (now Chennai) to look for work.

Career
Reddy started his career in the cinema industry as an assistant editor for B. Vittalacharya's Kannada directorial Mane Tumbida Hennu.

His directorial debut was Rangamahal Rahasya (1970), starring Srinath, the success of which earned him recognition in the industry. It was followed by Modala Rathri (1970) with the same lead actor but the movie was not a commercial success. His third directorial venture, Cow Boy Kulla (1973), with Dwarakish was a reasonable success. His career took a turning point in 1973 when he directed his fourth movie, Gandhada Gudi which was the 150th movie of Rajkumar, who was the leading actor of Kannada films at that time, and the third movie of Vishnuvardhan, who had become a popular actor with the success of his debut movie Naagarahaavu. Gandhada Gudi became a milestone in Kannada films. Vijay's next five movies,  Sri Srinivasa Kalyana, Mayura, Naa Ninna Mareyalare, Badavara Bandhu and Sanaadi Appanna, all of which starred Rajkumar were huge commercial successes. He achieved national recognition with the 1977 movie Sanaadi Appanna which had acclaimed shehnai player Bismillah Khan playing the instrument for the lead actor Rajkumar. He directed Rajkumar in nine movies (excluding two cameo appearances) in varied genres including mythological, historical, novel based, folklore and social dramas.

Reddy had the distinction of having directed the 150th movies of both Rajkumar (Gandhada Gudi)  and Vishnuvardhan (Mojugara Sogasugara).

He was also instrumental in giving Shankar Nag a mass image through Auto Raja. Prior to that, he had directed Anant Nag in Naa Ninna Bidalaare which had made people take note of Anant's acting prowess. He directed two movies of Shiva Rajkumar - Shiva Mecchida Kannappa and Gandhada Gudi Part 2 both of which had Rajkumar in cameo appearances. He was the director of V. Ravichandran's debut movie Khadeema Kallaru in which he played a negative role.

He had also directed movies in other languages - Hindi, Tamil, Telugu and Malayalam - with the prominent one being the Hindi remake of Naa Ninna Mareyalare titled Pyar Kiya Hai Pyar Karenge starring Anil Kapoor. His other Hindi movies were - Teri Meherbaniyan - remake of Thaliya Bhagya,  
Jawab Hum Denge, Ganga Tere Desh Mein - remake of Huli Hebbuli and Paap Ka Ant. His debut Telugu movie was Srimathi.

He also produced two movies - Mullina Gulabi and  Kunthiputra. Vijay floated a production house — Vijaya Shekhar Productions — with another director V. Somashekhar and went on to produce several films. Vijay also directed 17 Hindi and six Telugu films, where he worked with the reigning stars of the time such as Rajesh Khanna, Dharmendra, Shatrughan Sinha and Mithun Chakraborty. He also had 48 Kannada films to his credit. His last directorial was the Vishnuvardhan starrer Karnataka Suputhra (1996). In 2000, he was selected to direct Rajkumar's ambitious mythological movie Bhakta Ambareesha which was subsequently shelved.

Death 
Reddy died on 9 October 2020 at the Apollo Hospital in Chennai.

Filmography

The following is a list of Kannada movies involving Vijay:

References

External links
 

1930s births
2020 deaths
Kannada film directors
Film directors from Bangalore
Kannada screenwriters
20th-century Indian film directors
Film producers from Bangalore
Kannada film producers
20th-century Indian dramatists and playwrights
Screenwriters from Bangalore